RFE may refer to:

 Radio Free Europe
 Reason for encounter, in medical records
 Request For Evidence, issued by the United States Citizenship and Immigration Services
 Recursive Feature Elimination, a feature selection algorithm in machine learning and statistics
 The Russian Far East
 Rainfall estimates, from the Famine Early Warning Systems Network
 Request for enhancement, or change request, in software development
 Road foreman of engines, a railroad occupation
 RFE (market research) (Recency, Frequency, Engagement)
 RFE Phonetic Alphabet, popular for phonetic notation in Spain and Mexico.